Salimi may refer to:

People
 Mostafa Salimi (1904–1994), Iranian football player and manager
 Ali Salimi (1922–1997), Iranian musician
 Mohammad Salimi (1937–2016), Iranian military commander
 Homayoun Salimi (born 1948), Iranian painter
 Khalid Salimi (born 1954), peace and human rights activist, art critic, and music columnist
 Fakhra Salimi (born 1957), Pakistani-born Norwegian human rights activist
 Youssef Salimi (born 1972), Algerian footballer
 Alireza Salimi (footballer) (born 1984), Iranian footballer
 Behdad Salimi (born 1989), Iranian weightlifter
 Abdulaziz Al Salimi (born 1991), Kuwaiti footballer
 Manutchehr Salimi (born ?), Iranian politician from north of Iran, Amarlu District

Other
 Salimi, Isfahan, a village in Iran
 a follower of the Sālimiyya Sufi movement

See also
 
 Salim (disambiguation)